Mangalagiri is a town in Guntur district of Indian state of Andhra Pradesh. The town is a part of Mangalagiri Tadepalle Municipal Corporation and part of Tenali revenue division. It is a major  sub urban of Vijayawada and a part of Vijayawada Metropolitan Area and Andhra Pradesh Capital Region. It is situated on National Highway 16 between Vijayawada and Guntur.

Ten villages namely Chinakakani, Kaza, Nutakki, Chinavadlapudi, Pedavadlapudi, Ramachandrapuram, Atamakuru, Nowluru, Yerrabalem, Nidamarru, Bethapudi are merged into Mangalagiri Municipality. The issue of the merger of the villages is now pending in the court.
Neighbourhoods in Vijayawada

Etymology 

Mangalagiri translates to The Auspicious Hill (Mangala = Auspicious, Giri = Hill) in the local language. It was derived from the name Totadri. During Vijayanagara Kingdom rule, it was also known as Mangala Nilayam.

History 

It is dated to 1520 and mentions the capture of Kondavidu by Timmarusu, general of Sri Krishnadevaraya, in 1515 from the Gajapati rulers of Kalinga (ancient Odisha). Another stone near the temple of Garudalvar has inscriptions on four sides recording grants in the reign of Sadasiva Raya of Vijayanagara Empire in 1538. The lofty gopuram in the temple at the foot of the hill was erected by Raja Vasireddy Venkatadri Nayudu in 1807–1809, and in terms of sculpture and architecture this temple stands to be an ultimate testament for the ancient vishwakarma sthapathis in planning and sculpting these temples.

Mangalagiri was under the control of Golkonda Nawabs for a long period. It was plundered in 1780 by Hyder Jung but could not be conquered. In 1816, a gang of Pindaris again looted the place. It slowly recovered from these two attacks during the time of Raja Vasireddy Venkatadri Nayudu who ruled the place from Amaravati. There is a big koneru (tank) in the center of the place which went dry in 1882. As many as 9,840 guns and 44 bullets which might have been related to Pindaris have been found here after the Pindaris looted this place. The picturesque hill was visited by the great Sri Krishna Deva Raya.

In the 1970s there was huge water scarcity in Mangalagiri. Goli Gopala Rao, the then Municipal Chairman of Mangalagiri, brought water to the town through water pipelines and he was called "Apara Baghiratha" due to his services to the public.

Geography 

It lies on hilly terrain. It falls under Seismic Zone 3.

Climate
The climate in Mangalagiri is tropical. The hottest months are from March–May and the coolest months from December–January. It receives south-west monsoon in the months of July–October and north–east monsoons in mid December.

Demographics 

The average literacy rate stands at 76.16% with  literates, significantly higher than the state average of 67.41%.

Governance

Civic Administration 
Mangalagiri Municipality is the civic body of the city, which oversees the civic needs like, water supply, sewage, garbage collection etc. It was establishment in the year 1969 and has an extent of  In March 2021 Tadepalli Municipality and Mangalagiri Municipality was merged along with corresponding villages and formed Mangalagiri Tadepalle Municipal Corporation.

Wards composition Mangalagiri Tadepalle Municipal Corporation has a total of 50 election wards. The composition of the municipality is of two types, one is Elected Wing, headed by Municipal Council and the second is Executive Wing, headed by Municipal commissioner. In 2015, the municipality received Green Leaf Awards 2015 in the category of Best Municipality, which was organized by NGO Sukuki Exnora. Mangalagiri municipality and its out growths of Navuluru and Atmakur are a part of Vijayawada urban agglomeration.

Politics 
Mangalagiri town is a part of Mangalagiri Assembly constituency for Andhra Pradesh Legislative Assembly. Alla Rama Krishna Reddy is the present MLA of the constituency representing YSRCP. The assembly segment is in turn a part of Guntur Lok Sabha constituency, which was won by Galla Jayadev of Telugu Desam Party.

Economy 
The production of handcrafted dyed fabric is the major occupation of the town, which is as old as 500 years. Mangalagiri Sarees and Fabrics was registered as one of the geographical indication from Andhra Pradesh.

Tourism 

Lakshmi Narasimha Temple is the abode of Lord Vishnu, who manifested himself as Thotadri, is present in Mangalagiri. There are three Narasimha Swamy temples. Undavalli caves, located in Undavalli, are a specimen of Indian rock-cut architecture. The historic caves are located at the top of the hills overlooking the Krishna river, built during the 4th-5th century. Dedicated to Ananta Padmanabha Swamy and Narasimha Swamy, Undavalli Cave Temples are associated with the Vishnukundina kings. Hinkar Thirtha Jain Temple, located in Namburu, is the largest Jain temple in the region, visited by many Jains, from different parts of the state.

Transport 

Mangalagiri is located on NH 16 that connects Kolkata and Chennai. The Tenali-Mangalagiri road is a part of the core road network of the district, that connects the town with the city of Tenali.

Mangalagiri bus station is owned and operated by APSRTC. The station is also equipped with a bus depot for operation and maintenance of buses. Mangalagiri railway station situated on the Vijayawada-Guntur main line, administered under the jurisdiction of Guntur railway division of South Central Railway zone.

Vijayawada International Airport at Gannavaram attracts the air commuters from this town.

There is a proposal of making Mangalagiri railway station a junction station by connecting the town with Tenali railway station in order to make the transportation from Guntur, Tenali, Amaravathi, Vijayawada cities easier.

APSRTC City Bus Routes

Education 
C. K. High School and C. K. Junior College & V.T.J.M &I.V.T.R degree college are first school and college respectively. The primary and secondary school education is imparted by government, aided and private schools, under the School Education Department of the state. The medium of instruction followed by different schools are English, Telugu and Urdu.

The town has many schools and colleges. University campuses include VIT-AP University and SRM AP University. AIIMS for the state of Andhra Pradesh was sanctioned and is decided to set up in the town.

Sports 

Mangalagiri International Cricket Stadium is under construction in Mangalagiri at a distance of 2 km from the city and comes in the vicinity of Nawlur.

See also 
Mangalagiri mandal

References

External links 

 Mangalagiri Temple

 
Towns in Guntur district
Hindu holy cities
Mandal headquarters in Guntur district
Towns in Andhra Pradesh Capital Region